Harry Ramsay is a fictional character from the Australian soap opera Neighbours, played by Will Moore. The character made his first screen appearance on 18 May 2009. Harry departed on 11 June 2010 after accepting a Basketball scholarship in Sydney.

Harry has been portrayed as having a unique persona, being a loner refusing to accept help from others and rebelling against those around him. The character has been involved in storylines including being orphaned, plots involving the Department of Human Services and his subsequent time in foster care. Moore revealed that some viewers became angry at some of the things Harry did during his time on the show.

Creation and casting
In February 2009, it was announced that Neighbours producers were introducing a new generation of the Ramsay family to the show, more than a decade after the family had last appeared. Executive producer Susan Bower said the introduction of the new characters was based on the American drama series Party of Five. She added "We have three orphans, basically. That, as you can imagine, has a tremendous amount of story material with it and they're fabulous! Wait until you see this cast. They just clicked". Bower introduced the new characters despite the show receiving criticism because they did not have a nuclear or a "normal" family. Bower said that where she lives, in the suburbs, "there's not a lot of your mum, dad and two kids". Actress Ashleigh Brewer was cast as older sister Kate Ramsay. It was after this Will Moore was cast as Harry, and Kaiya Jones was cast as Sophie Ramsay, completing the family unit. Speaking of his character being part of the Ramsay family Moore said "At first I thought "Oh my God, am I supposed to do something special?" Everyone said "Your character's Harry Ramsay? Like Ramsay Street?" So I have those connections, but I got used to playing it after a while. It's pretty cool to be playing a part that has so much history and it's cool that we're related to so many of the original characters – Anne Robinson and Max Ramsay had an affair and had our mum."

In March 2010, it was announced that Moore and Harry were to leave Neighbours in June. Bower said that she was aware that viewers would be disappointed that one of the Ramsays was leaving already. She added "We were very saddened too, because we fell in love with Harry, but Will had a one-year contract and he decided he didn't want to continue. I believe he's furthering his school studies." Bower also added that there were no plans to recast the role, because the character of Declan Napier had just been through a recast. Harry departed for a Basketball scholarship in Sydney on 11 June 2010.

Development
Harry has been described as a loner, an outcast and unlucky in love. Speaking of his character during an interview with Last Broadcast, Moore said "Harry is a confused teenager trying to figure out who he is. He's a bit of a loner and doesn't have too many friends. He puts up a facade of confidence and toughness, but really underneath he is a sensitive dork. All he really wants is to be accepted and fit in, but nothing seems to work for him. He also finds it hard to score with girls." Moore has also compared the character to himself commenting that he is a rebel.

During an interview with Channel Five's soap opera reporting site, Holy Soap, Moore revealed an insight into his character and how his storylines have had a direct effect on his personality stating: 

Network Ten state on the series official website that Harry only has a close relationship with Kate. They call him a "shrewd judge of character" and he makes "whip-like observations" of everything. He has a "reflective soul." Also describing him as an accomplished musician who meditates with music. Harry feels like he needs no one in his life but his sisters, playing a loner. He masks who he really is, a laid back character that tests everyone he meets fearing he cannot trust them, making harsh observations. They add he is hard to shock and likes children for their honesty and lack of guile which he applies to himself. They also state that due to his complex personality that other people think he is "aloof" and "withdrawn".

Harry has never been popular with female characters featured in Neighbours, often messing up any chance of a relationship due to his bad nerves around females other than his sisters. He also finds it hard to bond with other females as he masks his true identity whilst making his harsh observations he applies to other characters. Moore said he felt bad for Harry and that it was time for him to find some love. He said "Harry's been a bit isolated just having his sisters. Unfortunately you're not going to see any romance with Harry at all. The character hasn't been kissed before, which is quite incredible. He hasn't really been with a girl before so it's a very nerve-wracking experience for him and he kind of screws those opportunities up."

Storylines

Background
Harry is one of the Ramsay siblings who arrived in Erinsborough in 2009 following the death of their mother Jill Ramsay (Perri Cummings). Harry is the middle child and the only Ramsay boy, he is particularly close to Kate as she has been a mother figure to Harry. Harry has had to deal with a great deal already in his life and as a result he does not let others in easily. He is devoted to his two sisters and will do anything to ensure their safety and happiness.

2009–10
Despite finding out that Paul Robinson (Stefan Dennis) had not killed his mother, Harry still blamed Paul for taking her away from him. On his first day at Erinsborough High Harry met Declan Napier (James Sorensen) and Bridget Parker (Eloise Mignon) and he was unaware of Declan's connection to Paul. At the opening night of the school play, Kyle Canning tells Harry that Declan's mother Rebecca (Jane Hall) is Paul's girlfriend. Harry began a fight with Declan, which Dan Fitzgerald (Brett Tucker) interrupted. While helping out Bridget behind the scenes he found out she and Declan were a couple and asked her how Rebecca could stand by Paul. Declan appeared and another fight broke out between them, in which Harry was pushed off the stage. While Dan was telling them off, yet another fight broke out between them. They fell into a man holding a rope connected to some scenery, which crashed down on top of a Bridget. Harry later went to the hospital to see if Bridget and her unborn child were okay. Dan then gave Harry and Declan weekend detention. Harry later forgave Paul and he no longer blames him for his mother's death. During a jumble sale that Susan Kennedy (Jackie Woodburne) is holding, Harry sees a keyboard that he wants. He can't afford to buy it, but when it goes unsold, he breaks into the Kennedys' home to play it. When Susan discovers that Harry was the person who had broken into her home she asks him to play for her. During his time with Susan, Harry breaks down and cries when he plays Moonlight Sonata as it was his mother's favourite piece.

After Stephanie Scully (Carla Bonner) was blamed for the death of Bridget, Harry spray paints "Guilty" in on her driveway. He is caught by an angry Toadfish Rebecchi (Ryan Moloney) who says he is going to the police, but Harry begs him not to. Toadie makes him apologise to Steph and work for her doing jobs around the house. At first he was sullen and rude to Steph, but when he realised how upset she was about the accident they reconciled.

In the buildup to the Deb Ball, Harry was manipulated into buying alcohol by Amanda Fowler (Bella Heathcote). After smuggling the alcohol into the school and hiding it in a locker, it was discovered by Dan. Harry tried to pin the blame on Declan, but he later admitted that the bottle was his and he was suspended from Erinsborough High. As a result, Roz Challis (Janet Watson Kruse) from the DHS is forced to intervene with the Ramsay family's living arrangements and she rules that Harry is failing to adapt to his new life style and he is taken into foster care. Lou Carpenter (Tom Oliver) then offered to become the legal guardian of the Ramsay's and Paul and Toadie helped to improve Lou's image and financial situation. Whilst he was in care, Harry was bullied and beaten by a boy at his foster home. When Lou discovered this, he made Harry come back to Ramsay Street and was almost arrested for kidnapping Harry. Roz assures Lou that the situation was now sorted and Harry had to return to his foster home. The DHS eventually agreed to Lou becoming the Ramsay's guardian and when the paperwork came through, Harry was allowed to return home. Lou moved in with the family shortly afterwards.

Harry displays a natural talent for basketball and his cousin Andrew Robinson (Jordan Patrick Smith) encourages his ambition to play for school team. Scott Griffin, (Eamonn George), a school bully who is jealous of Harry's talent, tried to stop Harry from attending tryouts by intimidating and threatening him. Harry, with the support of his family, Andrew and Summer Hoyland (Jordy Lucas) decided to ignore Griffo and successfully tried out for team. Harry and Andrew both begin to compete to win Summer's affection and, after helping Summer out with her grandmother's love life, they share a kiss. However, Natasha Williams (Valentina Novakovic) tells Summer about Harry and Andrew's competition. Summer later tells Harry and Andrew that she does not want to be friends with them for them treating her like an object. Harry and Andrew decide to work together to regain Summer's friendship and she eventually forgives them until she gets into a fight with Natasha over her interfering with her friends and she realises how they have turned her into someone she doesn't want to be and so tells them she can't be their friend anymore. Harry grows jealous when he finds out that Summer is dating Chris Pappas (James Mason), but he eventually makes up with Summer. Sophie applies to the National Basketball Academy on Harry's behalf, as she knows he will not do it himself. Harry is then chosen to try out in front of Andrew Gaze. Harry is accepted into the academy and he struggles to tell Kate that he is going to be leaving for Sydney. Harry changes his mind about going after listening to Andrew, but Kate helps him out and convinces him that he has the courage to go. Harry then leaves for Sydney after saying goodbye to his friends and family.

Reception
The character of Harry has previously proved to outrage some viewers. Moore revealed that people had been angry at some of the stuff Harry had done. Moore said "They say 'How can you do this? You're such a horrible person.' I'm like 'Sorry.' Some people come up to me and say 'Did your mum really die?' And I'm like 'It's fictional!'".

References

External links
 Character Profile on the Neighbours Official AU website
 Character Profile on the Neighbours Official UK website

Neighbours characters
Fictional people from Victoria (Australia)
Fictional orphans
Television characters introduced in 2009
Male characters in television
Ramsay family